Motions and Emotions is a 1969 studio album by pianist Oscar Peterson, arranged by Claus Ogerman.

Track listing 
 "Sally's Tomato" (Henry Mancini) – 3:11
 "Sunny" (Bobby Hebb) – 3:33
 "By the Time I Get to Phoenix (Jimmy Webb) – 4:26
 "Wandering" (Gayle Caldwell) – 2:58
 "This Guy's in Love with You" (Burt Bacharach, Hal David) – 3:50
 "Wave" (Antonio Carlos Jobim) – 6:05
 "Dreamsville" (Ray Evans, Jay Livingston, Mancini) – 3:01
 "Yesterday" (Lennon–McCartney) – 3:59
 "Eleanor Rigby" (Lennon, McCartney) – 3:09
 "Ode to Billie Joe" (Bobbie Gentry) – 2:39

Personnel 
 Oscar Peterson – piano
 Bucky Pizzarelli – guitar
 Sam Jones – bass
 Bobby Durham – drums

Production 
 Matthias Kunnecke – producer
 Claus Ogerman – producer, conductor, orchestral arrangements
 David Nadien – concert master
 Dave Green – engineer
 Hans Georg Brunner-Schwer – engineer, remastering supervisor
 Willem Makkee – digital remastering

References 

1969 albums
Oscar Peterson albums
Albums arranged by Claus Ogerman
MPS Records albums
Albums conducted by Claus Ogerman
Albums produced by Claus Ogerman